WLMD (104.7 FM) is a radio station broadcasting a news/talk format. Licensed to Bushnell, Illinois, United States, the station serves the Macomb, Illinois area. WLMD is currently owned by Fletcher Ford, through licensee Virden Broadcasting Corp.

On August 26, 2015, WLMD changed their format from country to news/talk, branded as "Macomb News Now 104.7".

References

External links

LMD (FM)
News and talk radio stations in the United States
Radio stations established in 1992
1992 establishments in Illinois